The SS Normandie was a French ocean liner built in Saint-Nazaire, France, for the French Line Compagnie Générale Transatlantique (CGT). She entered service in 1935 as the largest and fastest passenger ship afloat, crossing the Atlantic in a record 4.14 days, and remains the most powerful steam turbo-electric-propelled passenger ship ever built.

Normandies novel design and lavish interiors led many to consider her the greatest of ocean liners, and she would go on to heavily influence the French arm of the Streamline Moderne design movement (called the style paquebot, or "ocean liner style"). Despite this, she was not a commercial success and relied partly on government subsidy to operate. During service as the flagship of the CGT, she made 139 westbound transatlantic crossings from her home port of Le Havre to New York City.

During the Second World War, Normandie was seized by U.S. authorities at New York and renamed USS Lafayette. In 1942,  while being converted to a troopship, the liner caught fire and capsized onto her port side and came to rest, half submerged, on the bottom of the Hudson River at Pier 88 (the site of the current New York Passenger Ship Terminal). Although salvaged at great expense, restoration was deemed too costly and she was scrapped in October 1946.

Origins
The origins of Normandie can be traced to the 1920s, when the U.S. put restrictions on immigration, greatly reducing the traditional market for steerage-class passengers from Europe, and placing a new emphasis on upper-class tourists, largely Americans, many of them wanting to escape prohibition. The French Line Compagnie Générale Transatlantique (CGT) began to plan its own superliner.

The designers intended their new superliner to be similar to earlier French Line ships. Then they were approached by Vladimir Yourkevitch, a former ship architect for the Imperial Russian Navy who had emigrated to France after the 1917 revolution. Yourkevitch's ideas included a slanting clipper-like bow and a bulbous forefoot beneath the waterline, in combination with a slim hydrodynamic hull. His concepts worked wonderfully in scale models, confirming the design's performance advantages. The French engineers were impressed and asked Yourkevitch to join their project. He also approached Cunard with his ideas, but was rejected because the bow was deemed too radical.

The CGT commissioned artists to create posters and publicity for the liner. One of the most famous posters was by Adolphe Mouron Cassandre, another Russian emigrant to France. This poster is displayed in the Musée national de la Marine in Paris.

Construction and launch

Work by the Société Anonyme des Chantiers de Penhoët began on the unnamed flagship on 26 January 1931 at Saint-Nazaire, soon after the stock market crash of 1929. While the French continued construction, the competing White Star Line ship (intended as Oceanic, and started before the crash) was cancelled and Cunard's  was put on hold. French builders also ran into difficulty and had to ask for government money; this subsidy was questioned in the press. Still, the ship's construction was followed by newspapers and national interest was deep, as she was designed to represent France in the nation-state contest of the great liners and was built in a French shipyard using French parts.

The growing hull in Saint-Nazaire had no formal designation except "T-6" ("T" for "Transat", an alternate name for the French Line, and "6" for "6th"), the contract name. Many names were suggested including Doumer, after Paul Doumer, the recently assassinated President of France; and originally, La Belle France. Finally Normandie was chosen. In France, boat prefixes properly depend on the boat name's gender, but non-sailors mostly use the masculine form, inherited from the French terms for boat, which can be "paquebot", "navire", "bateau", or "bâtiment", but English speakers refer to boats as feminine ("she's a beauty") and the GCT carried many rich American customers. The CGT wrote that their boat was to be called simply "Normandie", preceded by neither "le" nor "la" (French masculine/feminine for "the") to avoid any confusion.

On 29 October 1932 – three years to the day after the stock market crash – Normandie was launched in front of 200,000 spectators. The 27,567-ton hull that slid into the river Loire was the largest launched and the wave washed up the shoreline and over several hundred spectators, but with no injury. The ship was dedicated by Madame Marguerite Lebrun, wife of Albert Lebrun, the President of France. She was outfitted until early 1935, her interiors, funnels, engines, and other fittings put in to make her into a working vessel. Finally, in May 1935, Normandie was ready for trials, which were watched by reporters. The superiority of Yourkevitch's hull was visible: hardly a wave was created off the bulbous bow.

In addition to hull design which let her attain speed at far less power than other big liners, Normandie had a turbo-electric transmission, with turbo-generators and electric propulsion motors built by Alsthom of Belfort. The CGT chose turbo-electric transmission for the ability to use full power in reverse, and because, according to CGT officials, it was quieter and more easily controlled and maintained. The engine installation was heavier than conventional turbines and slightly less efficient at high speed but allowed all propellers to operate even if one engine was not running. This system also made it possible to eliminate astern turbines. An early form of radar was installed to prevent collisions. The rudder frame, including the 125-ton cast steel connecting rod, was produced by Škoda Works in Czechoslovakia.

Interior
Normandies luxurious interiors were designed in Art Déco and Streamline Moderne style by architect Pierre Patout, one of the founders of the Art Deco style. Many sculptures and wall paintings made allusions to Normandy, the province of France for which the ship was named. Drawings and photographs show a series of vast public rooms of great elegance. Her voluminous interior spaces were made possible by having the funnel uptakes split to pass along the sides of the ship, rather than straight upward. French architect Roger-Henri Expert was in charge of the overall decorative scheme.

Most of the public space was devoted to first-class passengers, including the dining room, first-class lounge, grill room, first-class swimming pool, theatre and winter garden. The first-class swimming pool featured staggered depths, with a shallow training beach for children. The children's dining room was decorated by Jean de Brunhoff, who covered the walls with Babar the Elephant and his entourage.

The interiors were filled with grand perspectives, spectacular entryways, and long, wide staircases. First-class suites were given unique designs by select designers. The most luxurious accommodations were the Deauville and Trouville apartments, featuring dining rooms, baby grand pianos, multiple bedrooms, and private decks.

[[File:SS Normandie (ship, 1935) interior.jpg|thumb|left|Normandie'''s main dining room, decorated with Lalique glass and compared to the Hall of Mirrors at Versailles.]]Normandies first-class dining hall was the largest room afloat. Passengers entered through  doors adorned with bronze medallions by artist Raymond Subes. The room could seat 700 at 157 tables, with Normandie serving as a floating promotion for the most sophisticated French cuisine of the period. As no natural light could enter it was illuminated by twelve tall pillars of Lalique glass flanked by 38 matching columns along the walls. These, with chandeliers hung at each end of the room, earned the Normandie the nickname "Ship of Light" (similar to Paris as the "City of Light").

A popular feature was the café grill, which would be transformed into a nightclub. Adjoining the café grill was the first-class smoking room, which was paneled in large murals depicting ancient Egyptian life. The ship also had indoor and outdoor pools, a chapel, and a theatre which could double as a stage and cinema.

The machinery of Normandies top deck and forecastle was integrated within the ship, concealing it and releasing nearly all the exposed deck space for passengers. As such it was the only ocean liner to have a regulation-sized open air tennis court on board. The air conditioner units were concealed along with the kennels inside the third, dummy, funnel.

CareerNormandies maiden voyage was on 29 May 1935. Fifty thousand saw her off at Le Havre on what was hoped would be a record-breaking crossing. She reached New York City after four days, three hours and two minutes, taking away the Blue Riband from the Italian liner . This brought great pride for the French, who had not won the distinction before.

During the maiden voyage, the CGT refused to predict that their ship would win the Blue Riband. However, by the time the ship reached New York, medallions of the Blue Riband victory, made in France, were delivered to passengers and the ship flew a 

 blue pennant. An estimated 100,000 spectators lined New York Harbor for Normandies arrival. All passengers were presented with a medal celebrating the occasion on behalf of the CGT.Normandie had a successful year but Queen Mary, Cunard White Star Line's superliner, entered service in the summer of 1936. Cunard White Star said Queen Mary would surpass 80,000 tons. At 79,280 tons, Normandie would no longer be the world's largest. The CGT increased Normandies size, mainly through the addition of an enclosed tourist lounge on the aft boat deck. Following these and other alterations, she measured 83,423 gross register tons. Exceeding Queen Mary by 2,000 tons, she would soon become the world's largest in terms of overall measured gross registered tonnage and length once again, claiming it off Queen Mary who only held it for a short amount of time.

The aircraft crashed onto Normandies bow. The pilot was taken off by tender, but the wreckage of the aircraft remained on board Normandie as she had to sail due to the tide. It was carried to Le Havre. A salvage team from the Royal Air Force later removed the wreckage. Horsey was court-martialled and found guilty on two charges. Evans' car was wrecked in the accident, which was brought up in Parliament.

In August 1936, Queen Mary captured the Blue Riband, averaging , starting a fierce rivalry.

During refit, Normandie was modified to reduce vibration. Her three-bladed screws were replaced with four-bladed ones, and structural modifications were made to her lower aft section. These modifications reduced vibration at speed. In July 1937 she regained the Blue Riband, but Queen Mary took it back next year. After this the captain of Normandie sent a message saying, "Bravo to the Queen Mary until next time!" This rivalry could have gone on into the 1940s, but was ended by the Second World War.Normandie carried distinguished passengers, including the authors Colette and Ernest Hemingway; the wife of French President Albert Lebrun; songwriters Noël Coward and Irving Berlin; and Hollywood celebrities such as Fred Astaire, Marlene Dietrich, Walt Disney, Douglas Fairbanks, Jr, and James Stewart. She also carried the von Trapp family singers of The Sound of Music from New York to Southampton in 1938, and from Southampton, the family went to Scandinavia for a tour before returning to the U.S.

Planned running mate – SS Bretagne
While Normandie rarely was occupied at over 60% of her capacity, her finances were such that she did not require government subsidies every year. She never repaid any of the loans that made her construction possible. The CGT considered a sister ship, SS Bretagne, which was to be longer and larger. There were two competing designs for this ship  one conservative, one radical. The conservative design was essentially Normandie with two funnels, possibly larger as well. The radical one was from Normandies designer, Vladimir Yourkevitch, and was super-streamlined with twin, side-by-side funnels just aft of the bridge. The more conservative design won, but the outbreak of the war halted the plan indefinitely.

Popularity
Although Normandie was a critical success in her design and decor, ultimately North Atlantic passengers flocked to the more traditional Queen Mary. Two of the ship's greatest attributes, in reality, turned out to be two of her biggest faults.

Part of Normandies problem lay in the fact that the majority of her passenger space was devoted solely to first class, which could carry up to 848 people. Less space and consideration were given to second and tourist class, which numbered only 670 and 454 passengers respectively. As a result, the consensus among North Atlantic passengers was that she was primarily a ship for the rich and famous. In contrast, in Queen Mary, Cunard White Star had placed just as much emphasis on decor, space, and accommodation in second and tourist class as in first class. Thus Queen Mary accommodated American tourists, who had become numerous in the 1920s and 1930s. Many of these passengers could not afford first-class passage yet wanted to travel with much of the same comfort as those experienced in first. As a result, second and tourist class became a major cash source for shipping companies at that time. Queen Mary would accommodate these trends and subsequently the liner achieved greater popularity among North Atlantic travellers during the late thirties.

Another of the CGT's greatest triumphs also turned out to be one of Normandies greatest flaws: her decor. The ship's slick and modern Art Déco interiors proved to be somewhat intimidating and uncomfortable for her travellers, with some claiming that interiors gave them headaches. It was also here that Queen Mary triumphed over her French rival. Although also decorated in an Art Déco style, Queen Mary was more restrained in her appointments and was not as radical as Normandie, and proved ultimately to be more popular with travellers.

As a result, Normandie at many times throughout her service history carried less than half her full complement of passengers. Her German rivals Bremen and Europa, and Italian rivals Rex and  also suffered from this problem; despite their innovative designs and luxurious interiors, they made little profit for their respective companies. Contributing to this were international boycotts against Germany and Italy as the European geopolitical situation deteriorated through the 1930s. The Italian liners relied heavily on government subsidies, while the German Lloyd liners never received funding. In comparison, Normandie did not require government subsidies in service, with her income covering not only her operating expenses but generating revenue of 158,000,000 francs.

In contrast, Cunard White Star's Britannic III, Georgic II, and much older Aquitania, along with the Holland America Line's , were among the few North Atlantic liners to make a profit, carrying the lion's share of passengers in the years preceding the Second World War.

World War II

The outbreak of the war found Normandie in New York Harbor. Looming hostilities in Europe had compelled Normandie to seek haven in the U.S. The federal government interned her on 3 September 1939, the same day France declared war on Germany. Soon Queen Mary, later refitted as a troopship, moored nearby. Then, two weeks later, Queen Elizabeth joined Queen Mary. For five months, the three largest liners in the world were tied up side by side. Normandie remained in French hands, with French crewmembers on board, led by Captain Hervé Lehuédé, into the spring of 1940.

On 15 May 1940, during the Battle of France, the U.S. Treasury Department detailed about 150 agents of the United States Coast Guard (USCG) to go aboard the ship and Manhattan's Pier 88 to defend it against possible sabotage. (At the time, U.S. law mandated the Coast Guard was a part of the Treasury during peacetime.) When the USCG became a part of the United States Navy on 1 November 1941, Normandies USCG detail remained intact, mainly observing while the French crew maintained the vessel's boilers, machinery, and other equipment, including the fire-watch system. On 12 December 1941, five days after the attack on Pearl Harbor, the USCG removed Captain Lehuédé and his crew and took possession of Normandie under the right of angary, maintaining steam in the boilers and other activities on the idled vessel. However, the elaborate fire-watch system which ensured that any fire would be suppressed before it became a danger was abandoned.

Lafayette conversion

On 20 December 1941, the Auxiliary Vessels Board officially recorded President Franklin D. Roosevelt's approval of Normandies transfer to the U.S. Navy. Plans called for the vessel to be turned into a troopship ("convoy unit loaded transport"). The Navy renamed her USS Lafayette, in honor of both Marquis de la Fayette, the French general who fought on the Colonies' behalf in the American Revolution, and the alliance with France that made American independence possible. The name was a suggestion of J. P. "Jim" Warburg, advisory assistant to Colonel William J. Donovan, Coordinator of Information, which was passed through multiple channels including Secretary of the Navy Frank Knox; Admiral Harold R. Stark, Chief of Naval Operations (CNO); and Rear Adm. Randall Jacobs, Chief of the Bureau of Navigation. The name La Fayette (later universally and unofficially contracted to Lafayette) was officially approved by the Secretary of the Navy on 31 December 1941, with the vessel classified as a transport, AP-53.

Earlier proposals included turning Lafayette into an aircraft carrier, but this was dropped in favor of immediate troop transport. The ship remained moored at Pier 88 for the conversion. A contract for her conversion to a troop transport was awarded to Robins Dry Dock and Repair Co., a subsidiary of Todd Shipyards, on 27 December 1941. On that date, Capt. Clayton M. Simmers, the 3rd Naval District Materiel Officer, reported to the Bureau of Ships (BuShips) his estimate that the conversion work could be completed by 31 January 1942, and planning for the work proceeded on that basis.

Capt. Robert G. Coman reported as Lafayette'''s prospective commanding officer on 31 January 1942, overseeing a skeleton engineering force numbering 458 men. The complicated nature and enormous size of the conversion effort prevented Coman's crew from adhering to the original schedule; crew familiarization with the vessel was an issue, and additional crew members were arriving to assist the effort. On 6 February 1942, a request for a two-week delay for the first sailing of Lafayette, originally scheduled for 14 February, was submitted to the Assistant Chief of Naval Operations. On that day, a schedule extension was granted due to a design plan change: elements of the superstructure were to be removed to improve stability, in work that was expected to take another 60 to 90 days. However, on 7 February, orders came from Washington that the reduction of the top-hamper had been abandoned and Lafayette was to sail on 14 February as planned. This abrupt reversal necessitated a frantic resumption of conversion work, and captains Coman and Simmers scheduled 9 February meetings in New York and Washington to lobby for further clarification of conversion plans; ultimately, these meetings would never take place.

Fire and capsizing

At 14:30 on 9 February 1942, sparks from a welding torch used by workman Clement Derrick ignited a stack of life vests filled with flammable kapok that had been stored in Lafayettes first-class lounge. The flammable varnished woodwork had not yet been removed, and the fire spread rapidly. The ship had a very efficient fire protection system, but it had been disconnected during the conversion and its internal pumping system was deactivated. The New York City Fire Department's hoses, unfortunately, did not fit the ship's French inlets. Before the fire department arrived, approximately 15 minutes after fire broke out, all onboard crew were using manual means in a vain attempt to stop the blaze. A strong northwesterly wind blowing over Lafayettes port quarter swept the blaze forward, eventually consuming the three upper decks of the ship within an hour of the start of the conflagration. Capt. Coman, along with Capt. Simmers, arrived about 15:25 to see his huge prospective command in flames.

As firefighters on shore and in fire boats poured water on the blaze, Lafayette developed a dangerous list to port due to water pumped into the seaward side by fireboats. Vladimir Yourkevitch, the ship's designer, arrived at the scene to offer expertise but was barred by harbor police. Yourkevitch's suggestion was to enter the vessel and open the sea-cocks. This would flood the lower decks and make her settle the few feet to the bottom. With the ship stabilised, water could be pumped into burning areas without the risk of capsizing. The suggestion was rejected by the commander of the 3rd Naval District, Rear Admiral Adolphus Andrews.

Between 17:45 and 18:00 on 9 February 1942, authorities considered the fire under control and began winding down operations until 20:00. Water entering Lafayette through submerged openings and flowing to the lower decks negated efforts to counter-flood, and her list to port gradually increased. Shortly after midnight, Rear Adm. Andrews ordered Lafayette abandoned. The ship continued to list, a process hastened by the 6,000 tons of water that had been sprayed on her. New York fire officials were concerned that the fire could spread to the nearby buildings. Lafayette eventually capsized during the mid watch (02:45) on 10 February, nearly crushing a fire boat, and came to rest on her port side at an angle of approximately 80 degrees. Recognising that his incompetence had caused the disaster, Rear Adm. Andrews ordered all pressmen barred from viewing the moment of capsize in an effort to lower the level of publicity.

One man died in the tragedy – Frank "Trent" Trentacosta, 36, of Brooklyn, a member of the fire watch. Some 94 USCG and Navy sailors, including some from Lafayettes pre-commissioning crew and men assigned to the receiving ship Seattle, 38 fire fighters, and 153 civilians, were treated for various injuries, burns, smoke inhalation, and exposure.

Saboteur (film)
The ruined Lafayette after the fire can be seen briefly in the film Saboteur (1942). The ship is not identified in the film, but the antagonist smiles when he sees it, suggesting that he was responsible. The film's director, Alfred Hitchcock, later said that "the Navy raised hell" about the implication that their security was so poor. The eastern seaboard of the U.S. was being attacked by German U-boats at the time of the film's release, but information was suppressed by the Navy.

Investigation and salvage

Enemy sabotage was widely suspected, but a congressional investigation in the wake of the sinking, chaired by Representative Patrick Henry Drewry (D-Virginia), concluded that the fire was accidental. The investigation found evidence of carelessness, rule violations, lack of coordination between the various parties on board, lack of clear command structure during the fire, and a hasty, poorly-planned conversion effort.

Members of organized crime retrospectively claimed that they had sabotaged the vessel. It was alleged that arson had been organized by mobster Anthony Anastasio, who was a power in the local longshoremen's union,  to provide leverage for the release of mob boss Charles "Lucky" Luciano from prison. Luciano's end of the bargain would be to ensure that there would be no further "enemy" sabotage in the ports where the mob had strong influence with the unions.

In one of the largest and most expensive salvage operations of its kind, estimated at $5million at the time (equivalent to $million in ), the ship was stripped of superstructure and righted on 7 August 1943. She was renamed Lafayette and reclassified as an aircraft and transport ferry, APV-4, on 15 September 1943 and placed in drydock the following month. However, extensive damage to her hull, deterioration of her machinery, and the necessity for employing manpower on other more critical war projects prevented resumption of the conversion program, with the cost of restoring her determined to be too great. Her hulk remained in the Navy's custody through the end of the war.

Lafayette was stricken from the Naval Vessel Register on 11 October 1945 without having ever sailed under the U.S. flag. President Harry Truman authorized her disposal in an Executive Order on 8 September 1946, and she was sold as scrap on 3 October 1946 to Lipsett, Inc., an American salvage company based in New York City, for US$161,680 (approx. $1,997,000 in 2017 value). After neither the Navy nor French Line offered a plan to salvage her, Yourkevitch, the ship's original designer, proposed to cut the ship down and restore her as a mid-sized liner. This plan also failed to draw backing. She was cut up for scrap beginning in October 1946 at Port Newark, New Jersey, and completely scrapped by 31 December 1948.

Legacy
Designer Marin-Marie gave an innovative line to Normandie, a silhouette which influenced ocean liners over the decades, including Queen Mary 2. The ambience of classic transatlantic liners like Normandie (and her chief rival, Queen Mary) was the source of inspiration for Disney Cruise Line's matching vessels, Disney Magic, Disney Wonder, Disney Dream, and Disney Fantasy.

Normandie also inspired the architecture and design of the Normandie Hotel in San Juan, Puerto Rico. The hotel's roof sign is one of the two signs that adorned the top deck of Normandie but were removed from it during an early refitting. It also inspired the nickname 'The Normandie' given to the International Savings Society Apartments in Shanghai, one of the most fashionable residential buildings during the city's pre-revolutionary heyday and home to several stars of China's mid-20th century film industry. Normandie name also inspired that of The Normandy apartment building in New York City.

Items from Normandie were sold at a series of auctions after her demise, and many pieces are considered valuable Art Déco treasures today. The rescued items include the ten large dining-room door medallions and fittings, and some of the individual Jean Dupas glass panels that formed the large murals mounted at the four corners of her Grand Salon. One entire corner is preserved at the Metropolitan Museum of Art in New York. The dining room door medallions are now on the exterior doors of Our Lady of Lebanon Maronite Cathedral in Brooklyn.

Also surviving are some examples of the 24,000 pieces of crystal, some from the massive Lalique torchères that adorned her dining salon. Also extant are some of the room's table silverware, chairs, and gold-plated bronze table bases. Custom-designed suite and cabin furniture as well as original artwork and statues that decorated the ship, or were built for use by the CGT aboard Normandie, also survive today.

The eight-foot-high, 1,000-pound bronze figural sculpture of a woman named "La Normandie", which was at the top of the grand stairway from the first class smoking room up to the grill room café, was found in a New Jersey scrapyard in 1954 and was purchased for the then-new Fontainebleau Hotel in Miami Beach, Florida. It was first displayed outside in the parterre gardens near the formal pool and later indoors near the then-Fontainebleau Hilton's spa. In 2001, the hotel sold the statue to Celebrity Cruises, which placed it in the main dining room of their new ship Celebrity Summit. The cruise ship also had a separate Normandie Restaurant, designed to reflect the interiors of the liner, and containing gold lacquered panels from the Normandie's First Class Smoking Room. The Normandie Restaurant and associated ocean liner decor was removed in 2015. The statue "La Paix", which stood in the First Class Dining Room, now stands in the Pinelawn Memorial Park, a cemetery in New York.

The three-note chime steam whistle, after salvage, was sent to the Bethlehem Steel factory in Bethlehem, Pennsylvania, where it was used to announce shift changes. It later resided in the Pratt Institute in Brooklyn and was used in their New Year's Eve steam whistle ceremony until 2014. This whistle is now at SUNY Maritime's Fort Schuyler.

Pieces from Normandie occasionally appear on the BBC television series Antiques Roadshow and also on its American counterpart. A public lounge and promenade was created from some of the panels and furniture from Normandie in the Hilton Chicago. The dining room "Normandie" on the Carnival Cruise ship Carnival Pride was also inspired by the ocean liner, per the ship's designer Joseph Farcus.

Profile views

See also
 
 
 [[SS Europa (1930)|SS Liberté]]
 
 Pierre-Marie Poisson
 
 Oceanic III
 The Big Broadcast of 1938, a 1938 film that featured the fictional ocean liner S.S. Colossal, based upon the NormandieNotes

References

Bibliography

 
 

External links

 How Biggest Ship Was Safely Launched, February 1933, Popular Science slipway and launching of French passenger liner Normandie in 1933—excellent drawing and illustrations showing basics of process
 "The Queen Of The Seven Seas"  Popular Mechanics, June 1935
 "Normandie a Marvel in Speed and Comfort" Popular Mechanics, August 1935 detailed drawings on steam-electric drive system
 "Across the Atlantic in a Blue Ribbon Winner" Popular Mechanics, October 1935
 The Normandie – virtual reality tour of the Art Deco masterpiece
 Pictures in the official French Lines Archives : SS Normandie (French captions)
 The Great Ocean Liners: Normandie 

 Hommage Au Normandie Exhibition, New York SS Normandie'' – Ocean Liner Museum Exhibit in New York City
 GG Archives Ephemera for the SS Normandie, including Passenger Lists, Menus, Brochures, Passage Tickets, Photographs, etc.

|-

|-

1932 ships
Art Deco ships
Blue Riband holders
Maritime incidents in February 1942
Ocean liners
Passenger ships of France
Ships built in France
Ship fires
Ships of the Compagnie Générale Transatlantique
Shipwrecks of the New York (state) coast
Turbo-electric steamships
United States home front during World War II
Transportation accidents in New York City
Ships named for Founding Fathers of the United States